Stenostrophia is a genus of beetles in the family Cerambycidae, containing the following species:

 Stenostrophia amabilis (LeConte, 1857)
 Stenostrophia coquilletti (Linell, 1897)
 Stenostrophia tribalteata (LeConte, 1873)

References

Lepturinae